European route E 62 is a road in Europe, part of the United Nations International E-road network. Between France and Italy it also passes through Switzerland, via Geneva and Lausanne. After crossing into Italy (shortly after the Simplon Pass, the highest point on the European route network inside Europe), the E 62 passes Milan, Italy's largest commercial and industrial centre, before descending to Genoa on the Mediterranean coast.

France 
N249 Nantes-Cholet-Parthenay

N149 Parthenay-Poitiers

N147 Poitiers-Bellac

N145 Bellac-Gueret-Montlucon-Moulins

N79 Moulins-Digoin-Macon

A40 Macon-Bourg en Bresse-Nantua-Switzerland

Switzerland 
A1 France-Geneva-Lausanne

A9 Lausanne-Vevey-Martigny-Sion-Brig-Simplon Pass-Gondo-Italy

Italy 
SS 33 Switzerland-Iselle-Domodossola-A8

A8 SS 33-Gallarate-Milano

A7 Milano-Pavia-Alessandria-Genova

The route

See also 
List of highest paved roads in Switzerland

External links 
 UN Economic Commission for Europe: Overall Map of E-road Network (2007)

62
E062
E062
E062